Their Compact is a 1917 American silent Western film produced and distributed by Metro Pictures and directed by Edwin Carewe. The film stars Francis X. Bushman and Beverly Bayne, a popular romantic screen duo at the time. This film is lost.

Plot
As described in a film magazine, Jim (Bushman) goes west to forget an affair with a vivacious but heartless eastern girl. He is wounded by a gang of toughs who try to scare him away from his mine, and Mollie (Bayne) nurses him until he recovers. Verda (Adams), his former sweetheart, comes west as the wife of his chum Bob (Mortimer). While Bob places his wife in Jim's care and leaves on a business trip, Verda plans to run away with the leader of the thugs, who has stolen the gold from Jim's mine. However, the early return of Jim frustrates her plans, so she accuses Jim of insulting her. Bob then swears that he will kill Jim, but is shot by the gang leader. Verda and the gangster leave, but Jim overtakes them and brings Verda back to her dying husband. She is then driven out of town, and Jim and Mollie have a happy reunion.

Cast
 Francis X. Bushman - James Van Dyke Moore
 Beverly Bayne - Mollie Anderson
 Henry Mortimer - Robert Forrest
 Harry S. Northrup - 'Ace High' Norton
 Mildred Adams - Verda Forrest
 Robert Chandler - 'Pop' Anderson
 John Smiley - Peters
 Thomas Delmar - 'Pay Dirt' Thompson

Reception
Like many American films of the time, Their Compact was subject to cuts by city and state film censorship boards. The Chicago Board of Censors directed that two shooting scenes at the cabin during a fight be cut.

References

External links
 
 
 Lobby cards for the film: #1, #2

1917 films
1917 Western (genre) films
Lost Western (genre) films
Films based on short fiction
Films directed by Edwin Carewe
American black-and-white films
Lost American films
Metro Pictures films
1917 lost films
Silent American Western (genre) films
1910s American films
1910s English-language films